State Highway 14 (SH 14) in the U.S. state of Colorado is an east–west state highway approximately  long. One of the longest state highways in Colorado, it traverses four counties along the northern edge of the state, spanning a geography from the continental divide in the Rocky Mountains to the Great Plains, and including North Park, the Poudre Canyon, and the Pawnee National Grassland. It provides the most direct route from Fort Collins westward via Cameron Pass to Walden and Steamboat Springs, and eastward across the plains to Sterling.

The highway is two-lane along its entire route, except for portions near Fort Collins where it is concurrent with U.S. Highway 287, and east of Fort Collins near its interchange with Interstate 25.

The western terminus of the highway is on the continental divide, at a junction with U.S. Highway 40 at the summit of Muddy Pass along the border between Jackson and Grand counties. The eastern terminus is at a junction with U.S. Highway 6 in Sterling.

The entire length of the highway is kept open year-round. Despite its western end being on the continental divide itself, Route 14 through Cameron Pass can be one of the more reliable routes across the Front Range mountains in stormy winter weather.

Route description

Going eastward from Muddy Pass southeast of Steamboat Springs, it transverses through North Park, first going northeast to Walden, then southeast through Gould along the valley of the Michigan River. It then transverses along the southern end of the Medicine Bow Mountains at Cameron Pass, where it enters Larimer County. It then descends through the pass to the northwest along the valley of Joe Wright Creek to Chambers Lake, traveling through the mountains along the valley of the Cache la Poudre River and passing through the Poudre Canyon. It joins U.S. Highway 287 southbound at Teds Place, a longtime local landmark just east of the mouth of the Poudre Canyon. It is concurrent with U.S. Route 287 southward to Fort Collins, where it splits from 287, going east from downtown Fort Collins along East Mulberry Street and reaching Interstate 25 at exit 269.  East of I-25, it enters Weld County and passes through Ault, where it intersects U.S. Highway 85. East of Ault, it enters a sparsely populated area of the high plains in eastern Weld County, where it passes through three small towns, Briggsdale, New Raymer, and Stoneham. Along this stretch it passes alongside several parcels of the Pawnee National Grasslands. Its eastern terminus at Sterling is in central Logan County, along the South Platte River, just across the river from Interstate 76.

History

The section of the road in Fort Collins that is concurrent with Jefferson Street and Riverside Avenue follows a section of the Overland Trail, a stage route and emigrant trail used in the 1860s. The section in Fort Collins was known as the "Denver Road". The section up the Poudre Canyon was built in the 1920s.

The route as a Colorado state highway was established in the 1920s from its current western terminus all the way to Nebraska. In 1926, US 38 took over its routing from Sterling, its current eastern terminus, to Nebraska. The route was paved in 1936 from Fort Collins to Ault. The entire route was paved by 1963, and the eastern section of the route concurrent with U.S. Highway 6 east of Sterling was eliminated in 1968. The only gap left was eliminated in 1979.

Major intersections

References

External links

014
Transportation in Jackson County, Colorado
Transportation in Larimer County, Colorado
Transportation in Weld County, Colorado
Transportation in Logan County, Colorado
Fort Collins, Colorado